Bill Serong (born 5 May 1936) is a former Australian rules footballer who played for Collingwood and North Melbourne in the VFL.

He went to the Christian Brothers' College in Victoria Parade, and was the Australian handball champion in 1974, aged 38.

Football
Serong usually played as a centreman but was also seen on the half forward flanks. He made his league debut in 1956 with Collingwood and played in their 1958 premiership side as well as two losing grand finals with the club. In 1959 he placed equal second in the Brownlow Medal count. He finished his career with a season at North Melbourne in 1962, winning their best and fairest award.

He was captain-coach of Echuca in the 1963 and 1964 Bendigo Football League seasons. Serong won the 1965 - Bendigo FL best and fairest award, the Michelsen Medal. Serong also won Echuca's best and fairest award in 1964 and 1965.

Serong played one game for Camberwell Football Club in 1967.

See also
 Australian football at the 1956 Summer Olympics

Notes

References
 A Smash Hit, The Age, (Thursday, 25 March 1965), p.28.

External links

 Bill Serong at ''Collingwood Forever.

1936 births
Australian rules footballers from Victoria (Australia)
Players of Australian handball
Collingwood Football Club players
Collingwood Football Club Premiership players
North Melbourne Football Club players
Echuca Football Club players
Camberwell Football Club players
Syd Barker Medal winners
Living people
One-time VFL/AFL Premiership players

References